"The Hook" is the tenth episode and first season finale of the American murder mystery comedy-drama television series Poker Face. The episode was written by series creator Rian Johnson and directed by Janicza Bravo. It was released on Peacock on March 9, 2023.

The series follows Charlie Cale, a woman with the ability to detect if people are lying. After using her ability to win poker tournaments, she is caught by a powerful casino owner in Laughlin. Rather than banning her from his casino, he gives her a job as a waitress. After her friend is found dead, Charlie uncovers a plot where the owner's son ordered her murder to protect a powerful client. She is now on the run after exposing the casino, with head of security Cliff going after her. This episode follows Charlie, having been found by Cliff, who takes her to Atlantic City to see Sterling Frost Sr. to settle her debts.

The episode received critical acclaim, with critics praising the directing, writing, performances, tension, humor and closure of storylines.

Plot
At the coroner's office in Laughlin, Sterling Frost Sr. (Ron Perlman) has just seen the corpse of his son. He calls Charlie Cale (Natasha Lyonne), informing her he will use all he has to track her down. He then assigns Cliff (Benjamin Bratt) to find her, telling him that once he does, he must call him to ask "how deep to dig the hole".

Despite his best efforts, Cliff repeatedly fails to catch Charlie. Over a year of pursuing her, he is finally notified of her location in Colorado. He instead finds the corpse of "Mortimer Bernstein" in the coroner's office, who was identified as Charlie in the crime scene. He is directed to a "Jane Doe" at the nearby hospital and informs Frost that he finally caught to her. Unexpectedly, Frost tells him to wait until she recovers before taking her to him, frustrating Cliff. Two months later, Charlie is released from the hospital, and is also informed that her bills have been paid by a private party. As she steps outside, she finds Cliff waiting for her and despondently goes with him. During the road trip, he recites the song "Hook" by Blues Traveler to annoy her. She asks him if he was the one who killed her friend Natalie and he silently confirms. He stops the car in a nearby school's parking then tempts her into taking a revolver in his glovebox, but she refuses to shoot and he takes the gun from her.

Cliff drives her to Atlantic City, New Jersey, where she meets Frost at a casino hotel. She is surprised to find that Frost changed his mind over the past year, and that he does not blame her for his son's death anymore. He reveals why he eventually had Cliff looking for her: since he wiretapped all his casinos, he recorded a conversation his son had with Beatrix Hasp, Frost's rival and the owner of the casino they are currently in. His son planned to make business with the Hasp family, which is part of the Five Families, despite being forbidden by Frost. Frost came to the casino for a meeting and offers Charlie $500,000 and her freedom if she sits with him during the meeting to detect any possible lie. Charlie is delighted to be given a new lease on life, and Frost complements the gesture with a gift. They are both surprised, however, when Charlie pulls a revolver from the box. At the moment she does so, the lights go out and Frost is shot dead. Charlie drops the gun and flees the scene while Cliff calls for security.

In a flashback from months earlier, it is revealed that Cliff's patience and his loyalty towards Frost had run out during his year-long chase of Charlie, and he entered in a contract with Beatrix Hasp to kill Frost. To Cliff's delight, they planned to use Charlie as a scapegoat to hide the involvement of the Five Families, which if known would threaten the delicate peace with the other crime syndicates. He retrieved the revolver Charlie touched from his car, and replaced the content of Frost's gift box, her old name tag, with a similar revolver. During their conversation at the casino, Cliff used a remote control to turn off the lights and killed Frost with the revolver covered with Charlie's fingerprints, which he then swapped with the revolver Charlie dropped for the FBI to find.

Hiding in the hotel, Charlie calls FBI Agent Luca Clark (Simon Helberg). Clark has been assigned to lead the murder case, having been promoted after Charlie supplied him with the information regarding Caine. While he will not pursue her, he advises her to leave town. She manages to escape by joining a bachelorette's party bus. She reaches the house of her estranged sister, Emily (Clea DuVall), who is not delighted to see her. She gives Charlie the keys to their father's boat, and while she admits she knows her sister is a good person at heart, she also says she leaves no place for her and her niece to be a part of the life she chose for herself.

Charlie is unable to use the boat due to a massive hole in it. With no other option, she calls Cliff for help, unaware of his role in Frost's death. He tells her to meet him on his boat, where he plans to deliver her to the authorities. Coincidentally being not that far away, Charlie comes long before they arrive. She discusses possible scenarios with Cliff, who carefully avoids lying by indirectly answering her questions. As Cliff stalls her by pretending to start up the boat, Charlie finds blacklight-reactive poker chips, which were used to mark Frost during the blackout. She instantly realizes what happened just as police sirens are heard.

She fights Cliff off, manages to hit him in the eye with a penis-shaped ring that she received from the bachelorette's party and escapes by jumping into the water. Cliff, now blind in the left eye, is met by an FBI team led by Luca, who recovered Frost's incriminating tape where Sterling Jr. ordered Cliff to kill Natalie and her husband, and he is arrested. A while later, Luca drives Charlie's Plymouth Barracuda to a diner where they reunite. With Cliff's testimony, Charlie's name has been cleared while the authorities look for Beatrix Hasp. He once again offers her a job at the FBI, but she declines, taking her Plymouth Barracuda, and leaving Luca to settle the diner's bill. Once she leaves the diner, she is called by Beatrix Hasp (Rhea Perlman), who wants revenge for Charlie ruining her plans, which ignited a war in the criminal underworld. She offers her a deal: Charlie can work for the Five Families or she will be hunted down. Charlie chooses the latter and destroys her phone, ready to take on the road again.

Production

Development

The series was announced in March 2021, with Rian Johnson serving as creator, writer, director and executive producer. Johnson stated that the series would delve into "the type of fun, character driven, case-of-the-week mystery goodness I grew up watching." The episode was directed by Janicza Bravo, while series creator Rian Johnson wrote it. This was Bravo's first directing credit, and Johnson's second writing credit for the show.

Casting
The announcement of the series included that Natasha Lyonne would serve as the main lead actress. She was approached by Johnson about working on a procedural project together, with Lyonne as the lead character. As Johnson explained, the role was "completely cut to measure for her." Benjamin Bratt also joined the series in the recurring role of Cliff, whose character chases Charlie after she ran away from the casino in the first episode.

Due to the series' procedural aspects, the episodes feature several guest stars. Johnson was inspired by the amount of actors who guest starred on Columbo, wanting to deem each guest star as the star of the episode, which allowed them to attract many actors. The episode featured appearances by Simon Helberg, Ron Perlman, Clea DuVall, and Rhea Perlman, who were announced to guest star in June, August and October 2022, respectively. Ron Perlman previously appeared in "Dead Man's Hand" in a voice cameo at the end of the episode, while Simon Helberg reprised his role from "Time of the Monkey".

Writing
The episode deviates from previous episodes; instead of the howcatchem structure, it was used to move forward with the Frost storyline. Rian Johnson compared it to Quantum Leap, which often had episodes that could move the storyline. He said, "I don't think I could have ended the season without giving it some big season ending. It felt really good to do something that broke the mold and felt like a cap in a satisfying way, which means calling back to the beginning." 

Throughout the episode, there are many easter eggs revolving around "hooks". These include the episode's title, Cliff reciting the song "Hook" by Blues Traveler, and Hook playing when Charlie visited Emily. Johnson explained that it means "the format of the show, and the addictive little hooks in life that pull us into situations." 

The episode introduced Charlie's sister, Emily, played by Clea DuVall. The writers wanted to explore Charlie's past without delving too much. Co-showrunner Lilla Zuckerman explained, "we arrived at this idea of her having a scene with her sister while we were breaking the rest of the season, and I think it was smart for us to save it for the finale." Charlie's scenes with Emily were inspired by Inside Llewyn Davis, where "you don't necessarily understand all of the old wounds between these people — you just get a little peek."

Charlie choosing to go on the run was described as a "bittersweet" ending by co-showrunner Nora Zuckerman, who explained, "She is so aware of who she is and what her problems are. [...] But she is confident as she leaves the finale that she will be OK. Maybe we're not so sure, but Charlie is. So, I think we want to go on the ride with her."

Critical reception
"The Hook" received critical acclaim. Saloni Gajjar of The A.V. Club gave the episode an "A–" grade and wrote, "For the most part, Rian Johnson's Peacock drama has evolved into a crackerjack hit centered around Charlie's lie-sniffing gimmick. The show has delivered thrilling murder mysteries, fascinating characters played by notable stars, and the slowest of slow reveals about Charlie's history. The first season wraps on a high note by finally pulling on that last thread and introducing Charlie's estranged sister, Emily, played by Clea DuVall. It's a proper BIAC reunion."

Alan Sepinwall of Rolling Stone wrote, "'The Hook' so expertly bottled that delicate balance of comedy, drama, and suspense that has made this show so wonderful. Some episodes this season trended more towards silliness, some more towards danger, and some — this one included — had it all in spades. It's an hour where Charlie can be in genuine fear for her life, while also escaping peril for the moment by sneaking aboard a party bus full of drunken bridesmaids." 

Amanda Whiting of Vulture gave the episode a 4 star rating out of 5 and wrote, "Personally, I like it this way. Poker Face was billed as a 'ten-part mystery series', but the door has been left open for a little more Charlie to come. Perhaps Johnson and Natasha Lyonne will even take a page from Columbos book, a show that between 1990 and 2003 put out another 14 episodes, sometimes with years between them. Maybe Charlie is a character we'll check in on from time to time over the next decade just to prove that she's still out there, doing good while always claiming to be the kind of person who does the least." 

Miles Surrey of The Ringer gave the episode a 4 star rating out of 5 and wrote, "Poker Face can take solace in the fact that its first season went out with a winning hand." Spencer Kornhaber of The Atlantic wrote, "As this week's season finale culminated with shots of a highway cutting through amber-toned fields, it inspired a counterintuitive feeling: hope in the American dream. The brutality contained in Poker Faces 10 episodes is outweighed by humor, humanism, intelligence, and, perhaps most crucially, optimism."

Accolades
TVLine named Natasha Lyonne as the "Performer of the Week" for the week of March 11, 2023, for her performance in the episode. The site wrote, "In the end, Charlie caught the bad guy, of course — using an, um, unusual ring to subdue Cliff — and went back on the run, this time with a different casino boss vowing to track her down. (And we can't wait to see Lyonne tangle with Rhea Perlman in Season 2.) But for now, let's enjoy what Lyonne has given us this season: an instantly memorable TV character with an endless supply of sassy one-liners and a few hidden depths still left to explore."

Notes

References

External links
 

Poker Face (TV series) episodes
2023 American television episodes
Television episodes written by Rian Johnson
Television episodes set in New Jersey